Neville Foley was a prominent leader of the Anglo-Indian community in India. He was a Member of Parliament, representing Anglo-Indian reserved seats in the Lok Sabha the lower house of India's Parliament as a member of the Samata Party (Uday Mandal is current President).

References

Nominated members of the Lok Sabha
Samata Party politicians
1936 births
People from Ahmednagar
Living people